Hidden World or variants may refer to:

Books
Hidden Worlds, a 1974 book, by M. Van Der Veer and P. Moerman about existence of Atlantis and other pseudoarchaeology
Hidden World (novel), a novel by Stanton A. Coblentz
Hidden World, a 2008 fantasy novel by Paul Park in the A Princess of Roumania series
The Hidden World, a 1999 fantasy novel by Alison Baird

Other media
The Hidden World, a 2013–14 exhibition of work by American artist Jim Shaw
The Hidden World, a 1958 American science documentary film
How to Train Your Dragon: The Hidden World, a 2019 film by DreamWorks Animation
Hidden World (album), the 2006 debut album by hardcore punk band Fucked Up